Volodymyr Reksha (born 2 November 1982), is a Ukrainian strongman competitor.

Volodymyr was born in Lviv, Ukraine. He began strength training at an early age in local gym near his house. In 2003, he graduated from Lviv State University of Physical Culture. At the age of 21 he became a member of the Ukrainian weightlifting team. In 2010 began his career as a strongman. March 14, 2015 became a vice-champion (weight category up to 105 kg) at one of the most world prestigious tournaments, Arnold Strongman Classic 2015, arranged under the annual Arnold Schwarzenegger sports festival.

External links 
 Profile on www.strongliga.com

References 

1982 births
Living people
Sportspeople from Lviv
Ukrainian strength athletes